Warlords of Atlantis (aka Warlords of the Deep, though see below for further variant titles) is a 1978 British adventure science fiction film directed by Kevin Connor and starring Doug McClure, Peter Gilmore, Shane Rimmer, and Lea Brodie. The plot concerns a trip to the lost world of Atlantis. The screenplay was by Brian Hayles. It was filmed in colour with monaural sound and English dialogue, and runs for 96 minutes. Warlords of Atlantis received a Motion Picture Association of America (MPAA) rating of PG. It was novelised by Paul Victor.

Plot

At the beginning of the 20th century, British archaeologist Professor Aitken and his son, Charles, have hired Captain Daniels and his ship, the Texas Rose, to take them to sea. The pair plan to use a diving bell designed by engineer Greg Collinson to search for proof of the lost city of Atlantis.

On their first dive, Charles and Greg are attacked by a reptilian sea monster, which comes through the bottom of the diving bell. Greg sticks a live wire into the monster's mouth, electrocuting it. Immediately following this, they discover a statue made of solid gold, a sign that they have found proof of Atlantis.

When the statue is hoisted up to Texas Rose, deckhands Grogan, Fenn and Jacko hatch a scheme to take the gold. Grogan cuts the line to the diving bell, trapping Greg and Charles at the bottom of the sea, and another of the mutineers shoots the Professor in the back. Suddenly a gigantic octopus known as the Sentinel, sent by the inhabitants of Atlantis, attacks. The ship's four crewman are captured by the Sentinel, along with Greg and Charles in the diving bell. Only Sandy, the ship's cabin boy, and the Professor are left on Texas Rose.

The castaways are taken to a cavern beneath the ocean floor. They are greeted by Atmir, of the Atlantean ruling class, and the spear-wielding Guardians. Atmir promises to take them to safety, telling them en route that Atlantis has seven different cities, the first two of which have been sent down to the ocean, while a third one is now deserted and empty. Atmir takes the surface-dwellers through a prehistoric swamp inhabited by a millipede-like monster called the Mogdaan, before reaching the city of Vaar. There, five of the men are thrown into a dungeon, while Charles is taken to Chinqua, the royal city. As a scientist, Charles is deemed intelligent enough to be granted an audience with King Atraxon and Queen Atsil. They wish to make Charles one of them, and explain how they originally came from Mars and are using their mind powers to shape human history.

Greg and the Texas Rose crew make friends with Briggs, the captain of the long missing Mary Celeste. Briggs is the unofficial leader of the human slaves the Atlanteans' have captured, including his daughter, Delphine. Briggs informs them they will be given gills, thus will never be able to return to the oxygen-rich surface. They will then help protect Atlantis from the constant attacks of creatures known as Zaargs. A sudden Zaarg attack claims the life of Briggs, so Delphine helps Greg and the crew escape. Delphine shows the men a tunnel that will lead them into Atraxon's palace, where they can rescue Charles.

Charles is enjoying his status amongst the Atlanteans, and is intrigued when they show him the "utopia" they aim to create on Earth. When the others reach him, he refuses to leave. Greg deals Charles a knock-out blow and they carry him away from the mind powers of the Atlanteans. Regaining consciousness, Charles's head has cleared and he chooses to escape with Greg and the others.

The group retrace the route back. When they reach the swamp, the Mogdaan kills Jacko, but the others escape. When they reach the diving bell, Admir and the Guardians are waiting. Using telekinesis, Admir causes the sea water to erupt violently so as to scare the group, but they group continue through. Delphine, whose gills mean she can never leave Atlantis, covers their escape.

The group reach the diving bell, escaping to the surface. Return to Texas Rose, they are met by Sandy. Holding Fenn and Grogan at gun point, Sandy tells Greg, Charles and Daniels about the mutiny and the shooting. Daniels convinces Sandy to hand over the pistols, but then turns the tables, revealing that it was he who shot the Professor, who had refused his offer to make a profit out of their discovery. Fenn and Grogan lock them up with the Professor, but as they ponder their next move, the Sentinel attacks and destroys the ship. Daniels is crushed by the statue, while everyone else escapes by life boat.

Cast
 Doug McClure as Greg Collinson
 Peter Gilmore as Charles Aitken
 Shane Rimmer as Captain Daniels
 Lea Brodie as Delphine
 Michael Gothard as Atmir
 Hal Galili as Grogan 
 John Ratzenberger as Fenn
 Derry Power as Jacko
 Donald Bisset as Professor Aitken
 Ashley Knight as Sandy
 Robert Brown as Briggs
 Cyd Charisse as Atsil
 Daniel Massey as Atraxon

Production
The film was the fourth action-fantasy collaboration between Kevin Connor and Doug McClure. The first three were made by Amicus Productions, which had since wound up: this movie was made EMI Films, then run by Michael Deeley and Barry Spikings, and Columbia Pictures.

Filming started 5 September 1977. Location filming on Malta began on 1 October. A large amount of footage was shot on the island of Gozo. Filming ended 13 January 1978.

Title Variants
The film was originally known as Atlantis. However it was decided to change the title to avoid confusion with Atlantis, the Lost Continent (1961). So the title became 7 Cities of Atlantis. Then the TV series The Man from Atlantis flopped and executives did not want to associate the film with that show, so it became Warlords of the Deep. However Columbia, who partly financed, thought this was too close to The Deep so the title was changed again to Warlords of Atlantis.

Reception

Box office  
The film was the 15th most successful movie in the UK in 1978.

Critics
Variety noted "The one not inconsiderable virtue of the script is that it keeps the pot boiling. Direction by Kevin Connor and the editing keep the eye-filling pace brisk. The clichéd characters are played in workmanlike fashion by all hands"; Time Out wrote "As always, Connor's approach is commendably stolid, but this production lacks almost all the more pleasing elements of the earlier movies, and is sickeningly vulgar in its portrayal of Atlantis, right down to the leering emphasis on Cyd Charisse's legs"; TV Guide wrote "It's silly but harmless and won't offend anyone under 12 years of age"; and The Spinning Image noted the film was "scripted by former Doctor Who writer Brian Hayles, and has a similar strain of British idiosyncrasy about it, despite being an American co-production. Rest assured, the rubber monsters familiar from the first three films are present and correct, as is the piling on of incident and special effects, regardless of how convincing they are on screen...it's a fairly enjoyable ride with generally witty performances and plentiful action. And where else can you get to see Doug McClure beat up Cliff from Cheers?"

Novelization
The novelisation by Paul Victor was published in 1978, as a tie-in to the film, by Futura Publications Limited. Told entirely from the point of view of Greg Collinson, it follows the movie more or less faithfully. Notable changes, however, include the addition of a fourth crew member, Chuck, Grogan and Fenn being dragged back to Atlantis by the Sentinel instead of escaping with the others, and the attack by flying fish — which in the film occurs as the surface-dwellers are escaping across the causeway — happens much earlier during their approach to Vaar.

References

External links
 
 
 

1978 films
1978 British novels
1970s fantasy adventure films
1970s science fiction adventure films
British fantasy adventure films
British science fiction adventure films
Films about extraterrestrial life
Films directed by Kevin Connor
Films set in the Atlantic Ocean
Films set in Atlantis
Films shot at Pinewood Studios
Films with screenplays by Brian Hayles
EMI Films films
1970s English-language films
1970s British films